= Andrei Tarkovsky bibliography =

A list of books and essays about Andrei Tarkovsky :

- Fanu, Mark Le (1987). The cinema of Andrei Tarkovsky. BFI. ISBN 978-0-85170-193-6.
- Green, Peter (1993). Andrei Tarkovsky: The Winding Quest. Palgrave Macmillan. ISBN 978-1349119981.
- Johnson, V T (1994). The Films of Andrei Tarkovsky – A Visual Fugue (Paper). John Wiley & Sons. ISBN 978-0253208873.
- Tarkovsky, Andrey (1989). Sculpting in Time: Reflections on the Cinema. University of Texas Press. ISBN 978-0-292-77624-1.
- Gianvito, John (2006). Andrei Tarkovsky: Interviews. Univ. Press of Mississippi. ISBN 978-1-57806-220-1.
- Tarkovsky, Andrei (2007). Kar Minjoto Kar (in Kachin). Translated by Gala, Manilal. Kachh: Vadhod PIrkasan. ASIN B08PQR4WWN.
- Bird, Robert (15 April 2008). Andrei Tarkovsky: Elements of Cinema. Reaktion Books. ISBN 978-1-86189-342-0.
- Jeremy Mark, Robinson (2008). The Sacred Cinema of Andrei Tarkovsky. Crescent Moon Publishing. ISBN 978-1861712332.
- Martin, Sean (2011). Andrei Tarkovsky. Oldcastle Books Ltd. ISBN 978-1-84243-440-6.
- Robinson, Jeremy Mark (2012). Andrei Tarkovsky: Pocket Guide. Crescent Moon Publishing. ISBN 978-1861713957.
- Alexander-Garrett, Layla (2012). Andrei Tarkovsky: The Collector of Dreams. Glagoslav Publications Ltd. ISBN 978-1782670018.
- Boyadzhieva, Lyudmila (2014). Andrei Tarkovsky: A Life on the Cross. Glagoslav Publications Ltd. ISBN 978-1782671022.
- Pontara, Tobias (2019). Andrei Tarkovsky's Sounding Cinema: Music and Meaning from Solaris to The Sacrifice (Music and Sound on the International Screen). Routledge. ISBN 978-0367277291.
